Dhenuva Konda is a village in Andhra Pradesh, India.

Geography 
Dhenuva Konda (literally "Cow Hill") is located near to the bank of Gundlakamma river. Dhenuva Konda is surrounded by hills on three sides and wet fields on the north side. In the village there is fertile lands in north, east and part of west sides and dry lands are on south side. Most of the village land had been acquired to construct Kandula Obul Reddy Gundlakamma reservoir.

Denuvakonda rehabilitation colony given between Addanki and Medarmetla . some of Land owners chooses rehabilitation colony near between denuvakonda old village and Dodavaram.

References 

Villages in Prakasam district